Club Atlético Chiriquí is a Panamanian football team playing in Liga Panameña de Fútbol. It is based in David, Chiriquí and was founded on June 18, 2002 by Luis Denis Arce. Their home stadium is Estadio San Cristóbal.

History
Atlético Chiriquí was founded by Luis Denis Arce on 18 June 2002 after the disappearance of Chiriquí F.C. in season 2001.

In 2004 the team gained promotion from the Liga Nacional de Ascenso to the Liga Panameña de Fútbol after beating Sabanitas 3–2 in the first match and 5–2 on the last match.

Opening season Apertura 2009 I  came to semi-finals for the first time losing to San Francisco on aggregate 2 to 3, in Apertura 2009 II again came close to losing against Tauro semi-finals with an aggregate score of 4 to 7.

They bounced back from the Second Division in summer 2014 after being relegated a year earlier. They beat SUNTRACS 1–0 in the championship decider They earned their place in the final by winning the 2013 Apertura after beating Atlético Nacional 4–2 on aggregate.

Rivalries

Stadium

Atlético Chiriquí plays their home matches in Estadio San Cristóbal. The stadium is named after the saint and neighborhood San Cristóbal.

Honours
Liga Nacional de Ascenso (3): 2004, 2014, 2019
Super Final Ascenso LPF (2): 2014, 2019.

Season to season

5 seasons in Liga Panameña de Fútbol
3 seasons in Liga Nacional de Ascenso

Year-by-year results

Liga Panameña de Fútbol
{| class="wikitable"
|-
!Season
!Position
!colspan=8|League Record
!Playoffs
!colspan=2|Top Scorer
!Notes
|-
!
!
!P
!W
!T
!L
!F
!A
!+/-
!Pts
!
!Player
!G
!
|-
|2005
|7/10
|18
|5
|6
|7
|15
|24
| −9
|21
|debut
|
|
|
|-
|2005
|6/10
|16
|4
|5
|7
|20
|25
| −5
|17
|Could not qualify
|
|
|
|-
|2006
|9/10
|18
|4
|6
|8
|18
|29
| −11
|18
|Could not qualify
|
|
|
|-
|2006
|9/10
|18
|2
|4
|12
|14
|30
| −16
|10
|Could not qualify
|
|
|
|-
|2007 (A)
|6/10
|18
|7
|4
|7
|24
|13
| +11
|25
|Could not qualify
| José Dario Julio
|7
|
|-
|2007 (C)
|5/10
|18
|6
|8
|4
|21
|20
| −1
|26
|Could not qualify
| Catalino Smith
|5
|
|-
|2008 (A)
|8/10
|13
|4
|3
|6
|14
|22
| −8
|15
|Could not qualify
| Catalino Smith
|3
|
|-
|2008 (C)
|8/10
|18
|5
|4
|9
|19
|42
| −23
|19
|Could not qualify
| Eybir Bonaga
|6
|
|-
|2009 (A)I
|2/10
|20
|10
|6
|2
|35
|19
| +16
|33
|Semi-Finals
| Auriel Gallardo
|10
|Fell against San Francisco F.C. on aggregate 2–3
|-
|2009 (A)II
|2/10
|20
|11
|2
|5
|36
|26
| +10
|35
|Semi-Finals
| Oscar Vargas,  Gabriel Ávila
|6
|Fell against Tauro F.C. on aggregate 7–4
|-
|2010 (C)
|1/10
|20
|10
|3
|5
|28
|21
| +7
|33
|Semi-Finals
| Auriel Gallardo
|7
|Fell against San Francisco F.C. on aggregate 3–2
|-
|2010 (A)
|8/10
|18
|4
|7
|7
|22
|29
| -7
|19
|Could not qualify
| Gabriel de Los Rios
|8
|
|-
|2011 (C)
|7/10
|18
|6
|6
|6
|19
|20
| -1
|24
|Could not qualify
| Julian Martinez
|4
|
|-
|2011 (A)
|10/10
|18
|2
|5
|11
|12
|26
| -14
|11
| Could not qualify
| Gabriel Rios
|8
|
|-
|2012 (C)
|7/10
|18
|4
|8
|6
|14
|17
| -3
|20
|Could not qualify
|
|
|-
|2012 (A)
|10/10
|18
|2
|9
|7
|14
|23
| -9
|15
|Could not qualify
| Álvaro Hurtado
|2
|
|-
|2013 (C)
|9/10
|18
|2
|9
|7
|18
|24
| -6
|15
|Could not qualify
| Jose Ortega
|4
|Relegation to Liga Ascenso
|-
|2014 (A)
|9/10
|18
|4
|7
|7
|16
|21
| -5
|19
|Could not qualify
| Miguel Saavedra
|7
|Promotion to LPF 
|-
|2015 (C)
|10/10
|18
|4
|5
|9
|14
|25
| -11
|17
| Could not qualify
| Miguel Saavedra
|5
|
|-
|2015 (A)
|10/10
|18
|2
|8
|8
|17
|31
| -14
|14
| Could not qualify
| José Gómez
|4
|
|-
|2016 (C)
|5/10
|18
|7
|5
|6
|19
|17
| +2
|26
| Could not qualify
| Gabriel Ávila
|4
| Relegation to Liga Ascenso
|-
|2019 (A)
|9/10
|18
|5
|4
|9
|17
|29
| -12
|19
| Could not qualify
| Miguel Saavedra
|6
|Promotion to LPF'
|-
|2020(A)
|10/10
|8
|0
|1
|7
|2
|13
| -11
|1
| Could not qualify| Edgar Aparicio
|1
| Season suspended due to COVID-19 |-
|2020 (C)
|9/10
|9
|0
|5
|4
|6
|11
| -5
|5
| Could not qualify| Yeison Ortega
|1
| Season resumed|-
| New Format 
|-
|2021 (A)
|12/12 (6th West Conf.)
|25
|5
|8
|12
|29
|38
| -9
|23
| Could not qualify| Luis Pereira
|4
|
|-
|2021 (C)
|11/12 (5th West Conf.)
|16
|3
|6
|7
|12
|17
| -5
|15
| Could not qualify| Isaias Soto
|4
|
|-
|2022 (A)
|3/12 (1st West Conf.)
|16
|8
|4
|4
|21
|20
| +1
|28
|Semi-Finals
| Edgar Aparicio
|7
|Fell against Alianza F.C. on aggregate 1-2
|-
|2022 (C)
|12/12 (6th West Conf.)
|16
|1
|8
|7
|7
|25
| -18
|11
|Could not qualify 
| Jonathan Nisbeth
|2
|
|-
|}

Players
Current squad
 As of Apertura 2023''

Player of the year

Notable players

Historical list of coaches

 José Alfredo Poyatos (2006)
 Daniel Valencia (2007)
 Jair Palacios (2007)
 Leroy Foster (2008)
 Mario Méndez (2008 – Nov 10)
 Carlos Flores (Dec 2010 – July 11)
 Ismael Benítez (Aug 2011 – Aug 11)
 Orlando Arenas Valencia (Aug 2011– May 2012)
 Mario Méndez (May 2012 – Mar 2013)
 Javier Wanchope (Mar 2013– Nov 2015)
 Patricio Sampó (January 2019 - September 2019)
 Noel Gutiérrez (September 2019 - February 2020)
 Miguel Ángel Zahzú (March 2020 - July 2020)
 Patricio Sampó (August 2020 - June 2021)
 Alberto "Nino" Valencia (2021-2022)
 Dayron Peréz (2022 - Present)

Sponsors
Companies that Atlético Chiriquí currently has sponsorship deals with include:
  KELME – Official Partner.
 Hotel Ciudad de David – Main Partner
 Club Activo 20-30 – Main Partner
 Transporte Rivera Hermanos S.A. – Main Partner

References

External links
 Official website
 

Football clubs in Panama
Association football clubs established in 2002
2002 establishments in Panama
Chiriquí Province